Elias William Rector (June 11, 1849 – January 29, 1917) was an American politician who served as the 28th speaker of the Arkansas House of Representatives from January 1891 to January 1893.

Political career 
Elias William Rector was a member of the Arkansas House of Representatives, serving from 1886 to 1900. A member of the Democratic Party, He was an elector for Grover Cleveland in the presidential election of 1892, and was a candidate for the Democratic nomination for Governor of Arkansas in 1889 and 1902.

Personal life 
Rector was the son of former Arkansas governor Henry M. Rector.

References

External links 

1849 births
1917 deaths
19th-century American politicians
Burials in Arkansas
People from Garland County, Arkansas
People of the Brooks–Baxter War
Politicians from Little Rock, Arkansas
Speakers of the Arkansas House of Representatives
Democratic Party members of the Arkansas House of Representatives